Dad's Army: A Nostalgic Music and Laughter Show of Britain's Finest Hour was a 1975 stage adaptation of the BBC sitcom Dad's Army. Following the success of the television programme, the stage show was commissioned by Bernard Delfont in the spring of 1975.

Jimmy Perry and David Croft adapted material from the original scripts, making changes to allow for the absence of location filming. The show was in the style of a revue, with songs, familiar scenes from the show, and individual turns for cast members. It was produced by Roger Redfarn, who shared the same agent as the writers.

Cast

Jeffrey Holland, who would frequently collaborate with Croft in the future, portrayed multiple roles whereas Richard Matthews was cast as the only 2 female roles in the 2007 tour. Croft was particularly pleased with the casting of Jack Haig as Lcpl. Jack Jones as Haig was Croft's 1st choice for the role when they cast the television series.

Dates
The show opened at the Forum Theatre, Billingham, County Durham on 4 September 1975 for a two-week try out. A local critic wrote of the event:
"The special bond of affection between cast and audience helped each item spark along"  - Kevin Eason

After cuts and revisions, the show transferred to London's West End and opened at the Shaftesbury Theatre on 2 October 1975. On the opening night there was a surprise appearance by Chesney Allen, singing the old Flanagan and Allen song Hometown with Arthur Lowe.

The show ran in the West End from 4 October to 21 February 1976, where it was disrupted twice by bomb scares, and then toured the country until 4 September 1976. The stage show was later revived, billed as Dad’s Army—The Musical, and toured Australia and New Zealand in 2004–2005, starring Jon English.

1976 UK tour dates

Running order

Act One
 Scene 1 Who do you think you are kidding Mr Hitler?
 Scene 2 Put that light out
 Scene 3 When can I have a banana again?
 Scene 4 Command Post
 Scene 5 Private Pike's Dream
 Scene 6 Cliff top: Lance Corporal Jones stands guard
 Scene 7 Battle of Britain
 Scene 8 Choir practice

Act Two
 Scene 9 The song that we would rather forget
 Scene 10 Unarmed combat
 Scene 11 Tinpan alley
 Scene 12 Morris Dance
 Scene 13 A Nightingale sang in Berkley Square
 Scene 14 Radio personalities of the 40s
 Scene 15 The beach
 Scene 16 Finale

New stage show
In April 2007 a new Dad's Army stage show was announced. It featured two lost episodes ("The Loneliness of the Long Distance Walker" and "A Stripe for Frazer") combined with two additional episodes "Room at the Bottom" (of which only a black-and-white version existed until December 2008) and "The Deadly Attachment". A sequel to the 2007 stage show was announced in December 2009 with the tour starting the following year. It features the same cast as the 2007 show, but has different episodes, including "Branded" and "Mum's Army".

References

Bibliography
 Croft,D & Perry,J, Dad's Army: the lost episodes. London: Virgin, 1998 
 Pritchard,T: Stonehouse, Dad's Army- an appreciation. Dad's Army Appreciation Society, 2004 
 Webber,R, Complete A-Z of Dad's Army. London Orion 2000 

Dad's Army
1975 plays
1975 musicals